Kim Eric Drexler (born April 25, 1955) is an American engineer best known for studies of the potential of molecular nanotechnology (MNT), from the 1970s and 1980s.  His 1991 doctoral thesis at Massachusetts Institute of Technology was revised and published as the book Nanosystems: Molecular Machinery Manufacturing and Computation (1992), which received the Association of American Publishers award for Best Computer Science Book of 1992.

Life and work

K. Eric Drexler was strongly influenced by ideas on limits to growth in the early 1970s. During his first year at Massachusetts Institute of Technology, he sought out someone who was working on extraterrestrial resources. He found Gerard K. O'Neill of Princeton University, a physicist famous for his work on storage rings for particle accelerators and his landmark work on the concepts of space colonization. Drexler participated in NASA summer studies on space colonies in 1975 and 1976. He fabricated metal films a few tens of nanometers thick on a wax support to demonstrate the potentials of high-performance solar sails. He was active in space politics, helping the L5 Society defeat the Moon Treaty in 1980.  Besides working summers for O'Neill, building mass driver prototypes, Drexler delivered papers at the first three Space Manufacturing conferences at Princeton. The 1977 and 1979 papers were co-authored with Keith Henson, and patents were issued on both subjects, vapor phase fabrication and space radiators.

During the late 1970s, Drexler began to develop ideas about molecular nanotechnology (MNT). In 1979, he encountered Richard Feynman's provocative 1959 talk "There's Plenty of Room at the Bottom." In 1981, Drexler wrote a seminal research article, published by PNAS, "Molecular engineering: An approach to the development of general capabilities for molecular manipulation". This article has continued to be cited, more than 620 times, during the following 35 years.

The term "nano-technology" had been coined by the Tokyo University of Science professor Norio Taniguchi in 1974 to describe the precision manufacture of materials with nanometer tolerances, and Drexler unknowingly used a related term in his 1986 book Engines of Creation: The Coming Era of Nanotechnology to describe what later became known as molecular nanotechnology (MNT). In that book, he proposed the idea of a nanoscale "assembler" which would be able to build a copy of itself and of other items of arbitrary complexity. He also first published the term "grey goo" to describe what might happen if a hypothetical self-replicating molecular nanotechnology went out of control. He has subsequently tried to clarify his concerns about out-of-control self-replicators, and make the case that molecular manufacturing does not require such devices.

Education

Drexler holds three degrees from MIT. He received his B.S. in Interdisciplinary Sciences in 1977 and his M.S. in 1979 in Astro/Aerospace Engineering with a Master's thesis titled "Design of a High Performance Solar Sail System." In 1991, he earned a Ph.D. through the MIT Media Lab (formally, the Media Arts and Sciences Section, School of Architecture and Planning) after the department of electrical engineering and computer science refused to approve Drexler's plan of study.

His Ph.D. work was the first doctoral degree on the topic of molecular nanotechnology and his thesis, "Molecular Machinery and Manufacturing with Applications to Computation," was published (with minor editing) as Nanosystems: Molecular Machinery, Manufacturing and Computation (1992), which received the Association of American Publishers award for Best Computer Science Book of 1992.

Personal life

Drexler was married to Christine Peterson for 21 years. The marriage ended in 2002.

In 2006, Drexler married Rosa Wang, a former investment banker who works with Ashoka: Innovators for the Public on improving the social capital markets.

Drexler has arranged to be cryonically preserved in the event of legal death.

Reception

Drexler's work on nanotechnology was criticized as naive by Nobel Prize winner Richard Smalley in a 2001 Scientific American article. Smalley first argued that "fat fingers" made MNT impossible. He later argued that nanomachines would have to resemble chemical enzymes more than Drexler's assemblers and could only work in water. Drexler maintained that both were straw man arguments, and in the case of enzymes, wrote that "Prof. Klibanov wrote in 1994, ' ... using an enzyme in organic solvents eliminates several obstacles ... '" Drexler had difficulty in getting Smalley to respond, but in December 2003, Chemical and Engineering news carried a four-part debate. Ray Kurzweil disputes Smalley's arguments.

The National Academies of Sciences, Engineering, and Medicine, in its 2006 review of the National Nanotechnology Initiative, argues that it is difficult to predict the future capabilities of nanotechnology:

In science fiction
Drexler is mentioned in Neal Stephenson's science fiction novel The Diamond Age as one of the heroes of a future world where nanotechnology is ubiquitous.

In the science fiction novel Newton's Wake by Ken MacLeod, a 'drexler' is a nanotech assembler of pretty much anything that can fit in the volume of the particular machine—from socks to starships.

Drexler is also mentioned in the science fiction book Decipher by Stel Pavlou; his book is mentioned as one of the starting points of nanomachine construction, as well as giving a better understanding of the way carbon 60 was to be applied.

James Rollins references Drexler's Engines of Creation in his novel Excavation, using his theory of a molecular machine in two sections as a possible explanation for the mysterious "Substance Z" in the story.

Drexler gets a mention in Timothy Leary's Design for Dying in the "Mutation" section, briefly detailing the 8-circuit model of consciousness (pg. 91).

Drexler is mentioned in DC Comics' Doom Patrol vol. 2, #57 (published July 1992).

Drexler is mentioned in Michael Crichton's 2002 novel Prey in the introduction (pg xii).

The Drexler Facility (ドレクサー機関) of molecular nanotechnology research in the Japanese eroge visual novels Baldr Sky is named after him. The "Assemblers" are its key invention.

Works
 Engines of Creation (1986)
 Available online at e-drexler.com dead link
 Available online in Chinese as 创造的发动机
 Available online in Italian as MOTORI DI CREAZIONE: L’era prossima della nanotecnologia
 The Canvas of the Night (1990), (ar) Project Solar Sail, ed. Arthur C. Clarke, NAL/Roc Science Fiction.
 Unbounding the Future (1991; with Christine Peterson and Gayle Pergamit)
 Available online with free download at Unbounding the Future: the Nanotechnology Revolution
 Nanosystems: Molecular Machinery Manufacturing and Computation (1992)
 Sample chapters and a table of contents are available online at e.drexler.com
 Drexler's doctoral thesis, Molecular Machinery and Manufacturing with Applications to Computation, an earlier version of the text that became Nanosystems, is available online
 Engines of Creation 2.0: The Coming Era of Nanotechnology - Updated and Expanded, K. Eric Drexler, 647 pages, (February 2007)
 Radical Abundance: How a Revolution in Nanotechnology Will Change Civilization, May 7, 2013, 
 Reframing Superintelligence: Comprehensive AI Services as General Intelligence, K. Eric Drexler, Technical Report #2019-1,  Future of Humanity Institute, University of Oxford, 210 pages (2019)

See also
 Chemical vapor deposition, a type of "vapor phase fabrication"
 Foresight Institute
 AI safety

References

Further reading
 "The Creator": Interview with Eric Drexler by Michael Berry, 1991
 Nano: The Emerging Science of Nanotechnology by Ed Regis, 1995. 
 "The Incredible Shrinking World of Eric Drexler": Red Herring Interview by Anthony B. Perkins August 1, 1995
 "The Incredible Shrinking Man: K. Eric Drexler was the godfather of nanotechnology. But the MIT prodigy who dreamed up molecular machines was shoved aside by big science - and now he's an industry outcast." Ed Regis, Wired Magazine, Issue 12.10, October 2004
 Great Mambo Chicken and the Transhuman Condition by Ed Regis, 1990.

External links

 
 Who's Who in the Nanospace
 

1955 births
Living people
21st-century American engineers
American nanotechnologists
American non-fiction environmental writers
American transhumanists
MIT School of Engineering alumni
MIT School of Architecture and Planning alumni